Los Dominicos is a metro station on Line 1 of the Santiago Metro in Santiago, Chile, and is also the eastern terminal of this line.

The station was inaugurated on 7 January 2010 as part of the extension of the line from Escuela Militar to Los Dominicos, and is located at the end of Avenida Apoquindo (Apoquindo Avenue) at the junction with Camino El Alba (El Alba Road) in the municipality of Las Condes.  It is located under Los Dominicos Park and near a supermarket, a filling station and an office of the Civil Registry and Identification Service of Chile. The station has a surface area of 5,390 square metres or 58,017 square feet.

Los Dominicos station is an important transport connection point between the Santiago municipalities of Las Condes, Vitacura, La Reina and Lo Barnechea. It also provides public transportation access to the craft market “Pueblito de los Dominicos” (Los Dominicos Village) and the San Vicente Ferrer church, both popular touristic attractions, as well as the Los Dominicos fresh food market, located in Los Dominicos Park.

See also
Los Dominicos Park
Los Dominicos Village

References

External links
Website of the Santiago Metro
Station surrounding area

Santiago Metro stations
Railway stations opened in 2010
2010 establishments in Chile
Santiago Metro Line 1